The Woman on Trial is a 1927 American silent film directed by Mauritz Stiller, starring Pola Negri, and based on the play Confession by Erno Wajda (aka Ernest Vajda). Adolph Zukor, Jesse L. Lasky, and B. P. Schulberg produced for Paramount Pictures.

Fragments of this film survive at Museum of Modern Art. A reel of outtakes are held at George Eastman House.

Cast
Pola Negri as Julie
Einar Hanson as Pierre Bouton
Arnold Kent as Gaston Napier
Andre Sarti as John Morland
Baby Dorothy Brock as Paul
Valentina Zimina as Henrietta
Sidney Bracey as Brideaux
Bertram Marburgh as Morland's Lawyer
Gayne Whitman as Julie's Lawyer

References

External links
The Woman on Trial at IMDb.com

1927 films
American silent feature films
Lost American films
American films based on plays
Films directed by Mauritz Stiller
Paramount Pictures films
1927 drama films
Silent American drama films
Films produced by B. P. Schulberg
American black-and-white films
Lost drama films
1927 lost films
1920s American films